This is a list of active airlines in Brazil holding an Air Operator Certificate issued by the National Civil Aviation Agency of Brazil as of August 20, 2022. The list does not include purely Specialized and Air Taxi companies.

National regular and non-regular

National non-regular only

Air Taxi airlines operating systematic flights

See also
List of defunct airlines of Brazil
List of airlines of South America
List of airlines
Transportation in Brazil

References

 
Airlines
Brazil
Airlines
Brazil